Leonida Rèpaci (Palmi, 5 April 1898 – Marina di Pietrasanta, 19 July 1985) was an Italian writer and political activist. He won the Bagutta Prize in 1933 and was one of the originators of the Viareggio Prize, with Carlo Salsa and Alberto Colantuoni. He administered the prize until 1935 and then from 1946 until his death. From 1945 to 1946 he was the co-editor of the newspaper Il Tempo.

References

1898 births
1985 deaths
Italian communists
20th-century Italian politicians
Italian newspaper editors
Italian male writers
Male journalists
20th-century Italian writers
20th-century male writers
20th-century Italian journalists
People from Palmi
Italian activists